The Takeda (竹田) ōke (princely house) was the tenth and youngest branch of the Japanese Imperial Family created from branches of the Fushimi-no-miya house.

The Takeda-no-miya house was formed by Prince Tsunehisa, eldest son of Prince Kitashirakawa Yoshihisa (second Kitashirakawa-no-miya). He received the title Prince Takeda (Takeda-no-miya) and authorization to start a new branch of the Imperial Family in 1906.

References 

 
1906 establishments in Japan